Pseudonagoda is a genus of moths of the family Limacodidae.

Species
Pseudonagoda naessigi Holloway, 1990
Pseudonagoda siniaevi Solovyev, 2009

References 

 , 2009, Notes on South-East Asian Limacodidae (Lepidoptera, Zygaenoidea) with one new genus and eleven new species. Tijdschrift voor Entomology 152 (1): 167-183.

Limacodidae genera
Limacodidae